Crime Scene Kitchen is an American reality television series that premiered on Fox on May 26, 2021. The series is hosted by Joel McHale with Yolanda Gampp and Curtis Stone serving as judges.

In May 2022, the series was renewed for a second season.

Format 
In each episode, bakers are tasked with decoding the type of dessert that was prepared in a kitchen using only crumbs, flour trails and a few clues. They are then asked to recreate the desserts identified, from scratch, for the judges. Each episode consists of two rounds: winners of the first round receive an extra hint in the second round. The worst performing team in the second "Showpiece" round is eliminated from the competition.

Production 
On April 7, 2021, it was announced that Fox had ordered Crime Scene Kitchen, with Joel McHale as host, who also serves as an executive producer. Yolanda Gampp and Curtis Stone serve as judges for the series. The series premiered on May 26, 2021.

On May 16, 2022, it was announced that the series had been renewed for a second season.

Elimination table 

†The team won the first round and received an extra hint for the Showpiece Round.

Episodes

References

External links 
 
 

2020s American cooking television series
2020s American reality television series
2021 American television series debuts
Cooking competitions in the United States
English-language television shows
Food reality television series
Fox Broadcasting Company original programming
Television series by Fox Entertainment